In professional wrestling, the TNA Gut Check (also known as Impact Wrestling Gut Check) was a tryout program turned indy wrestling rookies reality series by the American professional wrestling promotion Total Nonstop Action Wrestling (TNA), now known as Impact Wrestling, as a means of recruiting new talent. The TNA Gut Check featured as a segment on occasional episodes of Impact Wrestling, the flagship television program of TNA. TNA Gut Check has also been used as a TNA One Night Only Pay-per-view on February 16, 2015.

Seminars
TNA staged its first "Gut Check" on October 16, 2004, in Atlanta, Georgia. The event saw entrants rated on the basis of their performance in five categories: "back bump", "mat techniques", "ring interviews", "running the ropes" and "squat challenge". The female and male events were won by Jaime Dauncey and Jon Bolen respectively, with Dauncey and Bolen rewarded with a $4,000 USD cash prize and a subsequent appearance on TNA programming. In 2005, Dauncey was signed to a developmental deal by TNA.

TNA holds seminars at venues around the United States and Canada, hosted by TNA backstage employees such as D'Lo Brown, Pat Kenney, Brian Hebner and Jeremy Borash. The seminars, which last two hours, cover "promos, drills, simulated matches and in-ring work". The seminars are aimed at "prospective professional wrestlers, announcers, managers, valets and referees". Participation in the seminars costs US$250.

A number of wrestlers have been awarded contracts with TNA after participating in Gut Check Seminars, including Crimson and Jesse Sorensen. From April 2012 onwards, TNA began inviting a small number of participants in the seminars to wrestle a tryout match on Impact Wrestling.

On February 3, 2022, Impact announced the return of the Gut Check, a one-day camp at the Arnold Classic on March 6, which will be held by John E. Bravo and Lance Storm. The winner of the Gut Check will be awarded an Impact Wrestling contract.

Television segment (April 2012- July 2013)
In April 2012, Gut Check began being featured as a regular segment on Impact Wrestling as part of each month's Open Fight Night episode. Contestants wrestled a match against a TNA wrestler, after which their performance was evaluated by three judges. Contestants who received a "yes" from at least two of the judges were awarded a contract with TNA and sent to Ohio Valley Wrestling, TNA's developmental territory, for further training.

On January 9, 2013, it was announced by TNA that the Gut Check segment would be overhauled with two contestants competing against each other instead of one contestant competing against a TNA wrestler.

The original judges for the TNA Gut Check were Ric Flair, the road agent Al Snow and TNA's Senior Vice President of Programming and Talent Relations, Bruce Prichard. On May 31, 2012, Flair, who would leave the company shortly thereafter, was replaced by the color commentator and retired wrestler Taz. On the November 29, 2012, episode of Impact Wrestling, Al Snow was replaced by D'Lo Brown for the night. On the March 7, 2013, episode of Impact Wrestling, Taz was replaced by Danny Davis.

TNA Gut Check contestants have featured in a number of angles:
After Joey Ryan was refused a contract on the May 31, 2012, episode of Impact Wrestling, he began a campaign against the decision on Twitter and YouTube that was spearheaded by the results of an online poll showing that 87% of respondents felt that he should have been awarded a contract. Beginning on the June 28 episode of Impact Wrestling, Ryan began appearing in the audience of the Impact Wrestling Zone during Gut Check segments, heckling the judges. On July 21, 2012, at the Pro Wrestling Guerrilla show "Threemendous III", Ryan used the Tazmission - the signature submission hold of Taz - to defeat his opponent, Famous B. At Bound for Glory 2012 on October 14, 2012, Ryan defeated Snow to receive a contract with TNA.
On the July 19, 2012, episode of Impact Wrestling, Sam Shaw was attacked by the Aces & Eights stable while being interviewed by Jeremy Borash. Shaw went on to wrestle Douglas Williams in a tryout match one week later.

Gut Check was cancelled when Bruce Pritchard was fired from TNA. At the same time, TNA launched a new online contest called Online Gut Check with hundreds of wrestlers where the fans voted for the winner. However, due to poor design it was possible for fans to post multiple votes for the same wrestler. The winner was German wrestler Bad Bones. In January 2014, Bad Bones was confirmed to appear in TNA Maximum Impact tour.

Contestants

April 2012—November 2012

1Flair served as the third judge for the inaugural Gut Check before being replaced by Taz.
2As Lewie had already received two "no" votes, Snow was not required to cast his vote.
3As York had already received two "yes" votes, Snow was not required to cast his vote. However, commentator Mike Tenay described York as having received a unanimous "yes" vote.
4Brisco was the only contestant to win their tryout match
5Brown substituted for Snow.

January 2013— July 2013

1Tazz served as the third judge for the revamped Gut Check before being replaced by Davis.
2As Magno had already received two "no" votes, Snow was not required to cast his vote.

One Night Only

TNA Gut check

TNA held a series of matches featuring ten Gut Check participants competing in singles matches and tag matches against ten members of the active roster: if they would win, they would move on to compete in the main event match where the winner of that match earns an appearance on the next live Impact Wrestling. It took place on February 16, 2015, from Universal Studios in Orlando, Florida; it was a part of TNA One Night Only's pay-per view events.

2022 Revival
On February 3, 2022, Impact announced the return of the Gut Check, a one-day camp at the Arnold Classic on March 6, which will be held by John E. Bravo and Lance Storm. The winner of the Gut Check will be awarded an Impact Wrestling contract.

On March 7, 2022, Impact Wrestling announced three Gut Check Winners by the names of Jason Hotch, Jack Price and Shogun they were awarded Impact Wrestling contracts.

Winners

See also
 WWE Diva Search
 WWE Tough Enough

References

External links
TNA Gut Check website

Impact Wrestling